In algebraic geometry, Lange's conjecture is a theorem about stability of vector bundles over curves, introduced by  and proved by Montserrat Teixidor i Bigas and Barbara Russo in 1999.

Statement
Let C be a smooth projective curve of genus greater or equal to 2.

has E stable provided that , where  is the slope of the respective bundle. The notion of a generic vector bundle here is a generic point in the moduli space of semistable vector bundles on C, and a generic extension is one that corresponds to a generic point in the vector space .

An original formulation by Lange is that for a pair of integers  and  such that , there exists a short exact sequence as above with E stable. This formulation is equivalent because the existence of a short exact sequence like that is an open condition on E in the moduli space of semistable vector bundles on C.

References

Notes

Vector bundles
Algebraic curves
Theorems in algebraic geometry
Conjectures that have been proved